Kolë is an Albanian masculine given name. People bearing the name Kolë include: 
Kolë Berisha (born 1947), Kosovan politician
Kolë Idromeno (1860–1939), Albanian painter
Kolë Tromara (1882–1945), Albanian nationalist and political figure 
Kolë Xhumari (1912–2006), Albanian academic

See also
Kole (name)

Albanian masculine given names